Dr. Henry Olisleger was Vice Chancellor of the Duchy of Cleves.

He negotiated the marriage of Lady Anne of Cleves, the Duke's sister, to King Henry VIII of England. Olisleger became the Cleves ambassador to England. When there were rumours about Catherine Howard committing adultery, Olisleger tried to persuade the King, Thomas Cranmer, to re-marry Anne.

References

Year of birth missing
Year of death missing
Ambassadors to England
People of the Tudor period
16th-century German people
16th-century politicians
People from the Duchy of Cleves